Aharon Gluska (born 1951) is an Israeli–American painter.

Early life
Gluska was born in 1951 in Hadera, Israel. He studied at the Académie des Beaux-Arts in Paris and Avni Institute of Fine Arts in Tel Aviv.

Grants
Gluska received grants from the National Endowment for the Arts and the Pollock-Krasner Foundation.

Awards
Gluska was one of two winners of the 1996 Zussman Prize for artists dealing with the Holocaust, from the Yad Vashem museum, for his paintings of prisoners at Auschwitz based on photographs of them taken by their Nazi guards.

Public collections
Gluska's art is displayed in the following locations:
Tel Aviv Museum of Art, Tel Aviv, Israel
Israel Museum, Jerusalem, Israel
Yad Vashem, Jerusalem, Israel
Jewish Museum, New York City, New York
Brooklyn Museum, Brooklyn, New York
Albright–Knox Art Gallery, Buffalo, New York
Cornell University Museum, Ithaca, New York
Bowdoin College Museum of Art, Brunswick, Maine
Walsh Gallery, Seton Hall University, South Orange, New Jersey

References

External links

1951 births
Israeli painters
Living people